Squan Beach Life-Saving Station #9 is located in Manasquan, Monmouth County, New Jersey, United States. The station was added to the National Register of Historic Places on March 5, 2008.

See also
National Register of Historic Places listings in Monmouth County, New Jersey

External Links 
Squan Beach Life Saving Station Museum

References

Government buildings on the National Register of Historic Places in New Jersey
Shingle Style architecture in New Jersey
Buildings and structures in Monmouth County, New Jersey
Life-Saving Service stations
National Register of Historic Places in Monmouth County, New Jersey
New Jersey Register of Historic Places
Life-Saving Service stations on the National Register of Historic Places
Manasquan, New Jersey